Tunzu (Tunzuii), or Itunzu, also known as Duguza (Dugusa) in Hausa, is a Kainji language of Nigeria.

Demographics
The Tunzu people live in 7 villages. There are 5 villages (including the main settlement of Gada) in Jos East LGA, Plateau State and 2 villages (Kurfi and Magama) in Toro LGA, Bauchi State. The Tunzu villages in Bauchi State are assimilated into Hausa culture. There were 2,500 speakers (2003 estimate), although there might be 2,000 more ethnic Tunzu who do not speak the Tunzu language.

References

East Kainji languages
Languages of Nigeria